The Ornament Tree is the 18th album by Scottish folk musician Bert Jansch, released virtually simultaneously with another album, Sketches.

Track listing
All songs Traditional unless otherwise noted.
"The Ornament Tree (Bonny Portmore)" - 3:50
"The Banks O'Sicily" (James Robertson, Hamish Henderson) - 3:33
"The Rambling Boys of Pleasure" - 4:40
"The Rocky Road to Dublin" - 2:58
"Three Dreamers" - 3:46
"The Mountain Streams" - 3:49
"The Blackbirds of Mullamore" - 4:47
"Lady Fair" - 2:15
"The Road Tae Dundee" - 4:07
"Tramps And Hawkers" - 3:15
"The January Man" (Dave Goulder) - 3:42
"Dobbins Flowery Vale" - 3:33

Personnel
Bert Jansch - guitar, vocals
Peter Kirtley - guitar
Nigel Portman Smith - bass, accordion
Dave Turner - bass
Maggie Boyle - flute, whistles, bodhran
Paul Boyle - fiddle
Richard Curran - fiddle
Steve Tilston - arpeggione, mandolin
Michael Klein - percussion, backing vocals

References

Bert Jansch albums
1990 albums